Prayer for Peace may refer to any prayer for peace, or more specifically:

 Daily Prayer for Peace, a spiritual technique of the Community of Christ
 Day of Prayer for the Peace of Jerusalem, a Pentecostal prayer meeting
 Peace Prayer of St. Francis of Assisi, an anonymous prayer associated with the Italian saint
 Prayer for Peace, a Sufi prayer
 "Prayer for Peace", a song recorded by Perry Como
 A Prayer for Peace, an album by Arthur Doyle

See also
 The World Peace Prayer Society, a non-sectarian pacifist organization
 World Day of Prayer for Peace, an occasional gathering of world religious leaders